A panzer corps was an armoured corps type in Nazi Germany's Wehrmacht during World War II.  The name was introduced in 1941, when the  motorised corps (Armeekorps (mot) or AK(mot)) were renamed to panzer corps. Panzer corps were created throughout the war, and existed in the Army, the Waffen-SS and even the Luftwaffe. Those renamed from ordinary motorised corps retained their numbering.

Purpose
Panzer corps underwent transformation as the war went on. Initially they were the main strike force of the Wehrmacht, and consisted of motorised infantry divisions (ID (mot)) and panzer divisions. Later in the war it was possible to find panzer corps that consisted solely of infantry divisions.

During the initial period of the war the panzer corps predecessor, the motorised corps,  were grouped into various panzer groups (Panzergruppen). Panzer groups were named (i.e. not designated with numbers) during the campaigns in Poland, France, and Greece, they were not used at all in Norway and Denmark in 1940, and numbered 1-4 during the first half year of the war against the Soviet Union. In the last case, a panzer group normally consisted of two or three motorized corps. They were the operational movement element of Army Group North, Army Group Centre and Army Group South.  The motorized corps served as the tactical command element in the command structure, with the individual divisions serving as tactical combat elements.

List of panzer corps

The following corps were AK(mot) and later Panzerkorps or were set up as Panzerkorps. Wehrmacht formations were designated either with Roman numerals or names:

Army
III Panzer Corps
IV Panzer Corps
VII Panzer Corps
XIV Panzer Corps
XIX Panzer Corps
XXIV Panzer Corps
XXXVIII Panzer Corps
XXXIX Panzer Corps
XL Panzer Corps
XXXXI Panzer Corps
XLVI Panzer Corps
XLVII Panzer Corps
XLVIII Panzer Corps
LVI Panzer Corps
LVII Panzer Corps
LVIII Panzer Corps (Germany)
LXXVI Panzer Corps
Panzer Corps Feldherrnhalle
Panzer Corps Grossdeutschland

Waffen-SS
I SS Panzer Corps
II SS Panzer Corps
III (Germanic) SS Panzer Corps
IV SS Panzer Corps
VII SS Panzer Corps

Luftwaffe
Parachute Panzer Corps Hermann Göring

See also
 Panzerwaffe
 Armoured Corps
 Military organization

References

 http://www.lexikon-der-wehrmacht.de/Gliederungen/KorpsPz/PzKprps.htm
 http://www.lexikon-der-wehrmacht.de/Gliederungen/KorpsSS/Gliederung.htm
 http://www.lexikon-der-wehrmacht.de/Gliederungen/KorpsSonstige/FallPzKorpsGliederung.htm
 de Beaulieu, Charles 'Der Vorstoss der Panzergruppe 4 auf Leningrad'

 
Panzer
Armoured units and formations of Germany